A landlord's gas safety certificate, also referred to as the landlord's gas safety record, is required by law to be held for all rental accommodation in the UK where there are gas appliances present. The requirement is enshrined in the Gas Safety (Installation and Use) Regulations 1998. The law requires all gas appliances in a rented property to be checked annually, with a gas safety record being completed and a copy provided to tenants. The definition of 'rented' is broad covering accommodation which is provided under a contractual arrangement for domestic staff as well as rented properties in general.

Gas safety records, Sometimes referred to as a CP12 (From CORGI Proforma 12 when CORGI was UK body for gas safety matters), are completed by engineers who must be registered with the Gas Safe Register scheme which took over from the previous CORGI scheme in 2009.

Gas safety checks should be carried out on any boilers, ovens, pipework, flues, chimneys and other fixtures and fittings that burn or exhaust gas. The checklist includes:

 Appliances are working at the correct pressure
 Appliances are burning gas properly
 There's adequate air supply to appliances
 Flues and chimneys are clear so gases and fumes can be safely discharged
 Safety devices on appliances are working as they should

Once the inspection has been carried out, and the certificate is issued it will contain the following information:

 Name, ID number and signature of the Gas Safe registered engineer
 Date of gas safety inspection
 Name and address of the landlord or letting agent (if it's a managed property)
 Address of the property
 Location and info about each of the gas appliances and flues
 Any problems and the follow-up action required to resolve them
 Confirmation from the engineer that the check was completed properly, in compliance with legislation
 Date of the next scheduled gas safety check (usually 12 months from the date of issue)

References

External links
HSE website to help landlords to understand their legal duties for gas safety. 
 Shelter guide on Gas safety
 Tenants' guide on Gas Safety, includes details of certification and emergency advice.
Gas Safe Register website - Landlord's responsibilities.

Carbon monoxide
Health and safety in the United Kingdom
Law of the United Kingdom
Natural gas industry in the United Kingdom
Natural gas safety